Christ Church is a historic Episcopal church located at Binghamton in Broome County, New York.  It is a one-story bluestone structure with Gothic Revival elements.  The church consists of a rectangular central section housing the nave and aisles, an apse and bell tower on the east facade, and side entrances through transepts on the north and south elevations.  It was built between 1853 and 1855 and was designed by noted church architect Richard Upjohn, (1802-1878).

It was listed on the National Register of Historic Places maintained by the U.S. Department of the Interior's National Park Service in 1974.

References

External links

Churches in Broome County, New York
Buildings and structures in Binghamton, New York
National Register of Historic Places in Broome County, New York
Historic American Buildings Survey in New York (state)
Churches on the National Register of Historic Places in New York (state)
Episcopal church buildings in New York (state)
Churches completed in 1853
19th-century Episcopal church buildings
Gothic Revival church buildings in New York (state)
Tourist attractions in Binghamton, New York